The men's 10,000 metres event at the 1990 World Junior Championships in Athletics was held in Plovdiv, Bulgaria, at Deveti Septemvri Stadium on 8 August.

Medalists

Results

Final
8 August

Participation
According to an unofficial count, 26 athletes from 18 countries participated in the event.

References

10,000 metres
Long distance running at the World Athletics U20 Championships